The Motor City Open 2012 is the 2012's Motor City Open (squash), which is a tournament of the PSA World Tour event International (Prize money: $50,000). The event took place at the Birmingham Athletic Club in Detroit in the United States from 27 to 30 January. Ong Beng Hee won his first Motor City Open trophy, beating Hisham Mohd Ashour in the final.

Prize money and ranking points
For 2012, the prize purse was $50,000. The prize money and points breakdown is as follows:

Seeds

Draw and results

See also
PSA World Tour 2012
Motor City Open (squash)

References

External links
PSA Motor City Open 2012 website
Motor City Open 2012 official website

Motor City Open (squash)
Motor City Open
2012 in American sports
2012 in sports in Michigan